Neosporidesmium antidesmae is a species of anamorphic ascomycete fungi, first found in tropical forests in Hainan, China, specifically in dead branches of Antidesma ghaesembilla, hence its name.

References

External links

MycoBank

Ascomycota